Deutsche Welle GmbH was a publicly licensed, though privately financed, German broadcasting company active during the Weimar era.

History
However, while the regional companies started operations between 1923 and 1924, Deutsche Welle did not begin broadcasting until , when it opened a long-wave transmitter (which soon became known as the Deutschlandsender, since its broadcasts could be heard all over Germany) at Königs Wusterhausen near Berlin. A large part of the station's output consisted of the retransmission of material from the regional broadcasting companies; within this framework Deutsche Welle attempted to emphasize educational programming for a nationwide audience.

The far reach of the Deutschlandsender's long-wave transmitter meant that Deutsche Welle's programming could be heard well beyond Germany's borders. In September 1926, the Munich regional station -- the Deutsche Stunde in Bayern -- received feedback from listeners in Amsterdam when its programmes first began to be relayed by the Deutschlandsender.

On 1 January 1933, Deutsche Welle GmbH was officially renamed Deutschlandsender GmbH and given the specific remit of relaying representative programme material from the regional companies to a national audience.

References

German radio networks
Defunct radio stations in Germany
Mass media companies established in 1924
Radio stations established in 1924
Mass media in Berlin
1924 establishments in Germany
Radio stations disestablished in 1933
1933 disestablishments in Germany